The Frankfurt School is a school of social theory and critical philosophy associated with the Institute for Social Research, at Goethe University Frankfurt in 1929. Founded in the Weimar Republic (1918–1933), during the European interwar period (1918–1939), the Frankfurt School initially comprised intellectuals, academics, and political dissidents dissatisfied with the contemporary socio-economic systems (capitalist, fascist, communist) of the 1930s. The Frankfurt theorists proposed that social theory was inadequate for explaining the turbulent political factionalism and reactionary politics occurring in 20th century liberal capitalist societies. Critical of both capitalism and of Marxism–Leninism as philosophically inflexible systems of social organization, the School's critical theory research indicated alternative paths to realizing the social development of a society and a nation.

The Frankfurt School perspective of critical investigation (open-ended and self-critical) is based upon Freudian, Marxist and Hegelian premises of idealist philosophy. To fill the omissions of 19th-century classical Marxism, which did not address 20th-century social problems, they applied the methods of antipositivist sociology, psychoanalysis, and existentialism. The School's sociologic works derived from syntheses of the thematically pertinent works of Immanuel Kant, Georg Wilhelm Friedrich Hegel, and Karl Marx, of Sigmund Freud and Max Weber, and of Georg Simmel and György Lukács.

Like Karl Marx, the Frankfurt School concerned themselves with the conditions (political, economic, societal) that allow for social change realized by way of rational social institutions. Their emphasis on the critical component of social theory derived from their attempts to overcome the ideological limitations of positivism, materialism, and determinism by returning to the critical philosophy of Kant and his successors in German idealism—principally the philosophy of Hegel, which emphasized dialectic and contradiction as intellectual properties inherent to the human grasp of material reality.

Since the 1960s, the critical-theory work of the Institute for Social Research has been guided by Jürgen Habermas's work in communicative rationality, linguistic intersubjectivity, and "the philosophical discourse of modernity." More recently, the "third generation" critical theorists  Nikolas Kompridis, Raymond Geuss, and Axel Honneth have opposed Habermas's propositions, claiming he has undermined the original social-change purposes of critical-theory-problems, such as what should reason mean; analysis of the conditions necessary to realize social emancipation; and critiques of contemporary capitalism.

History

Institute for Social Research

The term "Frankfurt School" describes the works of scholarship and the intellectuals who were the Institute for Social Research (Institut für Sozialforschung), an adjunct organization at Goethe University Frankfurt, founded in 1923, by Carl Grünberg, a Marxist professor of law at the University of Vienna. It was the first Marxist research center at a German university and was funded through the largesse of the wealthy student Felix Weil (1898–1975).

Weil's doctoral dissertation dealt with the practical problems of implementing socialism. In 1922, he organized the First Marxist Workweek  (Erste Marxistische Arbeitswoche) in effort to synthesize different trends of Marxism into a coherent, practical philosophy; the first symposium included György Lukács, Karl Korsch, Karl August Wittfogel and Friedrich Pollock. The success of the First Marxist Workweek prompted the formal establishment of a permanent institute for social research, and Weil negotiated with the Ministry of Education for a university professor to be director of the Institute for Social Research, thereby, formally ensuring that the Frankfurt School would be a university institution.

Korsch and Lukács participated in the Arbeitswoche, which included the study of Marxism and Philosophy (1923), by Karl Korsch, but their Communist Party membership precluded their active participation in the Institute for Social Research (Frankfurt School); yet Korsch participated in the School's publishing venture. Moreover, the political correctness by which the Communists compelled Lukács to repudiate his book History and Class Consciousness (1923) indicated that political, ideological, and intellectual independence from the communist party was a necessary work condition for realizing the production of knowledge.

The philosophical tradition of the Frankfurt School – the multi-disciplinary integration of the social sciences – is associated with the philosopher Max Horkheimer, who became the director in 1930, and recruited intellectuals such as Theodor W. Adorno (philosopher, sociologist, musicologist), Erich Fromm (psychoanalyst), and Herbert Marcuse (philosopher).

European interwar period (1918–39)
In the Weimar Republic (1918–33), the continual political turmoils of the interwar years (1918–39) much affected the development of the critical theory philosophy of the Frankfurt School. The scholars were especially influenced by the Communists’ failed German Revolution of 1918–19 (which Marx predicted) and by the rise of Nazism (1933–45), a German form of fascism. To explain such reactionary politics, the Frankfurt scholars applied critical selections of Marxist philosophy to interpret, illuminate, and explain the origins and causes of reactionary socio-economics in 20th-century Europe (a type of political economy unknown to Marx in the 19th century). The School's further intellectual development derived from the publication, in the 1930s, of the Economic and Philosophical Manuscripts of 1844 (1932) and The German Ideology (1932), in which Karl Marx showed logical continuity with Hegelianism as the basis of Marxist philosophy.

As the anti-intellectual threat of Nazism increased to political violence, the founders decided to move the Institute for Social Research out of Nazi Germany (1933–45). Soon after Adolf Hitler's rise to power in 1933, the Institute first moved from Frankfurt to Geneva, and then to New York City, in 1935, where the Frankfurt School joined Columbia University. The School's journal, the Zeitschrift für Sozialforschung ("Magazine of Social Research"), was renamed "Studies in Philosophy and Social Science". Thence began the period of the School's important work in Marxist critical theory; the scholarship and the investigational method gained acceptance among the academy, in the U.S and in the U.K. By the 1950s, the paths of scholarship led Horkheimer, Adorno, and Pollock to return to West Germany, whilst Marcuse, Löwenthal, and Kirchheimer remained in the U.S. In 1953, the Institute for Social Research (Frankfurt School) was formally re-established in Frankfurt, West Germany.

Theorists

As a term, the Frankfurt School usually includes the intellectuals Max Horkheimer, Theodor Adorno, Herbert Marcuse, Leo Löwenthal and Friedrich Pollock. Initially within the FS's inner circle, Jürgen Habermas was the first to diverge from Horkheimer's research program.

Religious Affiliations
The religious affiliations of the Frankfurt School entailed a history fraught with changes, continuities, and patterns. Participants in the inaugural symposium for the Institute of Social Research were predominantly Lutheran or nonpracticing Protestants, save for founder Carl Grünberg and philosopher György Lukács. Friedrich Pollock was also a possible exception, but his father was a former Jew who unexpectedly declined to raise Pollock in the Jewish faith. From there, as historian Peter Gordon argues, "nearly all the core members of the Frankfurt School were Jewish by heritage if not by conviction or practice." The addition of Theodor W. Adorno "complicated" this Judaism in toto of the Frankfurt School. When Adorno was seven years old, his father " 'detached himself' from the Jewish community in Frankfurt...Adorno's mother, Maria, was Catholic." Although his mother consented to a paternal surname, Adorno "was baptized in 1903 at the Frankfurt Cathedral into his mother's faith. Sometime later he was confirmed in a Protestant church." By the time he had completed his application for citizenship in the United States, Adorno switched from his father's surname to his maternal surname, "Adorno." Gordon, however, noted that "there is little evidence that Adorno ever tried to suppress the fact of his paternal lineage." In 1956, Adorno became an instructor and then dissertation advisor to Jürgen Habermas, a former Jungvolkführer teenage captain of the Deutsches Jungvolk who had publicly reviewed and renounced the Heideggerian "inner truth and greatness of that movement...N.S."  Beginning in 1970, under the self-described "methodological atheism" of Habermas, religious and spiritual affiliations for the so-called "second generation" and "third generation" of the Frankfurt School ranged from Catholicism, interdenominational Protestantism, and interdenominational Islam, to atheism, agnosticism, and Judaism. These affiliations neither precluded, nor always included, conflict, consensus, and a worldwide plurality of faiths.

Critical theory

The works of the Frankfurt School are understood in the context of the intellectual and practical objectives of critical theory. In Traditional and Critical Theory (1937), Max Horkheimer defined critical theory as social critique meant to effect sociologic change and realize intellectual emancipation, by way of enlightenment that is not dogmatic in its assumptions. Critical theory analyzes the true significance of the ruling understandings (the dominant ideology) generated in bourgeois society in order to show that the dominant ideology misrepresents how human relations occur in the real world and how capitalism justifies and legitimates the domination of people.

In the praxis of cultural hegemony, the dominant ideology is a ruling-class narrative story, which explains that what is occurring in society is the norm. Nonetheless, the story told through the ruling understandings conceals as much as it reveals about society. The task of the Frankfurt School was sociological analysis and interpretation of the areas of social-relation that Marx did not discuss in the 19th century – especially the base and superstructure aspects of a capitalist society.

Horkheimer opposed critical theory to traditional theory, wherein the word theory is applied in the positivistic sense of scientism, in the sense of a purely observational mode, which finds and establishes scientific law (generalizations) about the real world. Social sciences differ from natural sciences because their scientific generalizations cannot be readily derived from experience. The researcher's understanding of a social experience is always filtered through biases in the researcher's mind. The researcher does not understand is that he or she operates within an historical and ideological context. The results for the theory being tested would conform to the ideas of the researcher rather than the facts of the experience proper; in Traditional and Critical Theory (1937), Horkheimer said:

 

For Horkheimer, the methods of investigation applicable to the social sciences cannot imitate the scientific method applicable to the natural sciences. In that vein, the theoretical approaches of positivism and pragmatism, of neo-Kantianism and phenomenology failed to surpass the ideological constraints that restricted their application to social science, because of the inherent logico–mathematic prejudice that separates theory from actual life, i.e. such methods of investigation seek a logic that is always true, and independent of and without consideration for continuing human activity in the field under study. He felt that the appropriate response to such a dilemma was the development of a critical theory of Marxism.

Horkheimer believed the problem was epistemological saying "we should reconsider not merely the scientist, but the knowing individual, in general." Unlike Orthodox Marxism, which applies a template to critique and to action, critical theory is self-critical, with no claim to the universality of absolute truth. As such, it does not grant primacy to matter (materialism) or consciousness (idealism), because each epistemology distorts the reality under study to the benefit of a small group. In practice, critical theory is outside the philosophical strictures of traditional theory; however, as a way of thinking and of recovering humanity's self-knowledge, critical theory draws investigational resources and methods from Marxism.

Dialectical method
The Frankfurt School reformulated dialectics into a concrete method of investigation, derived from the Hegelian philosophy that an idea will pass over into its own negation, as the result of conflict between the inherently contradictory aspects of the idea. In opposition to previous modes of reasoning, which viewed things in abstraction, each by itself and as though endowed with fixed properties, Hegelian dialectics considers ideas according to their movement and change in time, according to their interrelations and interactions.

In Hegel's perspective, human history proceeds and evolves in a dialectical manner: the present embodies the rational Aufheben (sublation), the synthesis of past contradictions. However, the Problem of future contingents (considerations about the future) did not interest Hegel, for whom philosophy cannot be prescriptive and normative, because philosophy understands only in hindsight. The study of history is limited to descriptions of past and present human realities. For Hegel and his successors (the Right Hegelians), dialectics inevitably lead to approval of the status quo – as such, dialectical philosophy justifies the bases of Christian theology and of the Prussian state.

Karl Marx and the Young Hegelians strongly criticized that perspective; Hegel had over-reached in his abstract conception of "absolute Reason" and had failed to notice the "real"— i.e.  and  – life conditions of the proletariat. Marx inverted Hegel's idealist dialectics and advanced his own theory of dialectical materialism, arguing that "it is not the consciousness of men that determines their being, but that their social being that determines their consciousness." Marx's theory follows a materialist conception of history and geographic space, where the development of the productive forces is the primary motive force for historical change. The social and material contradictions inherent to capitalism lead to its negation – thereby replacing capitalism with Communism, a new, rational form of society.

Marx used dialectical analysis to uncover the contradictions in the predominant ideas of society, and in the social relations to which they are linked – exposing the underlying struggle between opposing forces. Only by becoming aware of the dialectic (i.e. class consciousness) of such opposing forces in a struggle for power can men and women intellectually liberate themselves, and change the existing social order through social progress. The Frankfurt School understood that a dialectical method could only be adopted ; if they adopted a self-correcting method – a dialectical method that would enable the correction of previous, false interpretations of the dialectical investigation. Accordingly, critical theory rejected the historicism and materialism of Orthodox Marxism.

Critique of Western civilization

Dialectic of Enlightenment and Minima Moralia
The second phase of Frankfurt School critical theory centres principally on two works: Adorno and Horkheimer's Dialectic of Enlightenment (1944) and Adorno's Minima Moralia (1951). The authors wrote both works during the institute's exile in America. While retaining much of a Marxian analysis, these works critical shifted emphasis from a critique of capitalism to a critique of Western civilization, as seen in Dialectic of Enlightenment, which uses the  Odyssey as a paradigm for their analysis of bourgeois consciousness. In these works, Horkheimer and Adorno present many themes that have come to dominate social thought. Their exposition of the domination of nature as a central characteristic of instrumental rationality in Western civilization was made long before ecology and environmentalism became popular concerns.

The analysis of reason now goes one stage further: The rationality of Western civilization appears as a fusion of domination and technological rationality, bringing all of external and internal nature under the power of the human subject. In the process the subject gets swallowed up and no social force analogous to the proletariat can be identified that enables the subject to emancipate itself. Hence the subtitle of Minima Moralia: "Reflections from Damaged Life". In Adorno's words:

Consequently, at a time when it appears that reality itself has become the basis for ideology, the greatest contribution that critical theory can make is to explore the dialectical contradictions of individual subjective experience on the one hand, and to preserve the truth of theory on the other. Even dialectical progress is put into doubt: "its truth or untruth is not inherent in the method itself, but in its intention in the historical process." This intention must be oriented toward integral freedom and happiness: "The only philosophy which can be responsibly practiced in face of despair is the attempt to contemplate all things as they would present themselves from the standpoint of redemption." Adorno distanced himself from the "optimism" of orthodox Marxism: "beside the demand thus placed on thought, the question of the reality or unreality of redemption [i.e. human emancipation] itself hardly matters."

From a sociological point of view, Horkheimer's and Adorno's works contain an ambivalence concerning the ultimate source or foundation of social domination, an ambivalence that gave rise to the "pessimism" of the new critical theory over the possibility of human emancipation and freedom. This ambivalence was rooted in the historical circumstances in which the work was originally produced, in particular, the rise of Nazism, state capitalism, and mass culture as entirely new forms of social domination that could not be adequately explained within the terms of traditional Marxist sociology. For Adorno and Horkheimer, state intervention in the economy had effectively abolished the tension in capitalism between the "relations of production" and "material productive forces of society"—a tension that, according to traditional Marxist theory, constituted the primary contradiction within capitalism. The previously "free" market (as an "unconscious" mechanism for the distribution of goods) and "irrevocable" private property of Marx's epoch gradually have been replaced by the more central role of management hierarchies at the firm level and macroeconomic interventions at the state level in contemporary Western societies. The dialectic through which Marx predicted the emancipation of modern society is suppressed, effectively being subjugated to a positivist rationality of domination.

About this second "phase" of the Frankfurt School, philosopher and critical theorist Nikolas Kompridis wrote:

Kompridis argues that this "sceptical cul-de-sac" was arrived at with "a lot of help from the once unspeakable and unprecedented barbarity of European fascism," and could not be gotten out of without "some well-marked [exit or] , showing the way out of the ever-recurring nightmare in which Enlightenment hopes and Holocaust horrors are fatally entangled." However, this , according to Kompridis, would not come until later – purportedly in the form of Jürgen Habermas's work on the intersubjective bases of communicative rationality.

In the Frankfurt School analysis, consumption culture and mass media displaced the role of a father figure in the paternalistic family. Rather than serving to liberate society from patriarchal authority however, this merely replaced it with the authority of the "totally administered" society. Christopher Lasch criticized subsequent liberatory movements of the 1960s for failing to reckon with this dynamic, which in his view led to a "culture of narcissism." Lasch believed the "later Frankfurt School" tended to ground political criticisms too much on psychiatric diagnoses like the authoritarian personality: "This procedure excused them from the difficult work of judgment and argumentation. Instead of arguing with opponents, they simply dismissed them on psychiatric grounds."

Art and music criticism
Walter Benjamin's essay The Work of Art in the Age of Mechanical Reproduction is a canonical text in art history and film studies. In it, Benjamin is optimistic about the potential of commodified works of art to introduce radical political views to the proletariat. Adorno and Horkheimer in contrast saw the rise of the culture industry as promoting homogeneity of thought and entrenching existing authorities.

Theodor Adorno came to America initially to work on the Princeton Radio Project, but it quickly became apparent that his theoretical bent was incompatible with the project's focus on opinion polling. Adorno's funding was not renewed after the initial two year period, and he was employed by the Institute for Social Research for the remainder of his time in America, before returning to Germany at the first opportunity.  While employed by the radio project, Adorno (a trained classical pianist) wrote The Philosophy of Modern Music (1949), in which he polemicized against popular music―because it has become part of the culture industry of advanced capitalist society and the false consciousness that contributes to social domination. He argued that radical art and music may preserve the truth by capturing the reality of human suffering. Hence:

This view of modern art as producing truth only through the negation of traditional aesthetic form and traditional norms of beauty because they have become ideological is characteristic of Adorno and of the Frankfurt School generally. It has been criticized by those who do not share its conception of modern society as a false totality that renders obsolete traditional conceptions and images of beauty and harmony. In particular, Adorno despised jazz and popular music, viewing it as part of the culture industry, that contributes to the present sustainability of capitalism by rendering it "aesthetically pleasing" and "agreeable". Martin Jay called the attack on jazz the least successful aspect of Adorno's work in America.

When others of the Frankfurt School settled in the United States, Benjamin went instead to Paris, whose architecture was central to the Arcades Project, a work that Benjamin thought would be his magnum opus. Adorno encouraged Benjamin to imbue the work with an overtly Marxist outlook, but on reading Benjamin's draft of the work's central chapter on Baudelaire, Adorno criticized Benjamin's uses of Marxist jargon, writing that he had, "denied yourself your boldest and most productive thoughts in a kind of precensorship." Although Adorno encouraged Benjamin to join him in America, and the institute obtained a work visa for him, Benjamin killed himself in 1940 on the mistaken belief he would not be able to leave France.

Adorno's media critiques were background to Frederic Wertham, a psychiatrist concerned with child welfare and school desegregation. Wertham's other work was overshadowed by his role in creating the Comics Code Authority that ended the Golden Age of Comics. Later, socialists in the 1980s criticized what they called the rigid and determinist view of popular culture deployed within the Frankfurt School theories of capitalist culture, which precluded any prefigurative role for social critique within such work. They argued that EC Comics often did contain such cultural critiques.

Positivism dispute

The epistemological aspects of the Frankfurt School are linked to the presence of Karl Popper on the scene of philosophical and scientific thought of the 20th century. Popper's response to philosophy indicates a link between critical theory and the crisis of scientific thought in the face of falsificationism. The boundaries of social disciplines are also involved in the revision of the debate on critical knowledge and dialectical reason. The bequests of authors such as Adorno, Hans Albert and Jürgen Habermas are also the text of the debate, culminating with the affirmation of the second Methodenstreit (See Guglielmo Rinzivillo, Passato e presente nello sviluppo della teoria critica della società su "Sociologia. Rivista Quadrimestrale di Scienze Storiche e Sociali", Anno LIV, N. 1, 2020, pp. 77–98; idem Second Part su "Sociologia. Rivista Quadrimestrale di Scienze Storiche e Sociali", Anno LIV, N. 2, 2020, pp. 89–108).

In 2020, philosopher Carl Sachs contended that the Frankfurt School and Vienna Circle, rather than Popperian adherents tout court, comprised the two sides of the debate. In addition to an overemphasis on Popper's seminar in this debate, each side misunderstood the extent of the other's grievances. In Sachs' telling, "Frankfurters" interpreted "the Vienna Circle as fundamentally concerned with the explication of objectivity, which they carried out in purely formal terms so that nothing ‘subjective’ entered into the conception of objectivity." Vienna Circle members, especially Popper, likewise misconstrued the Frankfurt School, specifically Adorno and Horkheimer, as omitting or repudiating "a better future" for society and physical science. Fears of determinism by the Frankfurt School propelled members to promote moments of violent revolution as the only means to escape such historicism. Thus approaches to gradual reform measures had been occluded from the ideas of the Frankfurt School. 

Sachs held that members of the Frankfurt School and members of the Vienna Circle underestimated each other. The Vienna School, rather than deemphasizing subjectivity and intersubjectivity in the pursuit of positivism, "never even attempted to study the role of subjectivity and intersubjectivity in epistemology." The Vienna Circle believed that "the commitment to the unity of science, the explication of a purely formal conception of objectivity, and the use of mathematical logic to do so are not epistemological projects." In fact, they had already arrived at a similar conclusion, that "speculative metaphysical systems such as those of Henri Bergson or German Idealism were useless for science because they could not satisfy the formal conditions of objectivity." The Vienna Circle instead wished to design a "formal semantics of declarative assertions" that could "be [universally] said to anyone by anyone," thereby furthering a "neglect of subjectivity" and, conversely, an "explication of objectivity" in "mathematical or symbolic logic" that produced "scientific explanations." Indeed, the Circle "conceptualize[d] the distinction between synthetic statements as truths of mathematical logic together with sensory qualities" to a certain extent, but their emphasis was on "declarative assertions" devoid of "subjectivity" in "mathematical or symbolic logic."

Frankfurt School members, on the other hand, did not aim to repudiate the notion of "a better future," an impulse that purportedly derived from their historicism. Rather, "the Frankfurters" were principally concerned with assessing conceptual underpinnings, including the development of a given "philosophy of language," that could potentially advance "irrationality and short-sightedness," both of which Sachs associated with "contemporary neoliberalism." The Frankfurt School, at least in its "first generation" (and, with a young Habermas, the beginning of the second), believed that "the truth-content of German Idealism had to be interpreted allegorically as the hope for a truly rational society." They hoped to forge a path to "a post-capitalist society in which cooperation, rather than competition, is the underlying logic of all institutions and the social practices supported by them." Common hope for a "utopian rational society," premised on different yet reconcilable beliefs, underscored the projects of both the Frankfurt and Vienna Schools. Sachs noted the compatibility element: "there is no reason why a purely formal explication of objectivity [by the Vienna Circle] should interfere with a diagnosis and critique of social pathologies of rational subjectivity and intersubjectivity [by the Frankfurt School]."

Communicative action

Habermas's "reformulation of critical theory" has been accused by philosopher Nikolas Kompridis as solving "too well, the dilemmas of the philosophy of the subject and the problem of modernity's self-reassurance", while creating a self-understanding of critical theory that is too close to liberal theories of justice and the normative order of society. He contended that, while "this has produced an important contemporary variant of liberal theories of justice, different enough to be a challenge to liberal theory, but not enough to preserve sufficient continuity with critical theory's past, it severely weakened the identity of critical theory and inadvertently initiated its premature dissolution."

Praxis
The first generation of Frankfurt scholars generally engaged in theory and avoided political commitments or praxis in the post-war years. Max Horkheimer opposed any revolutionary rhetoric in the institute's publications, since it could jeopardize funding from the West German government. Theodor Adorno showed some sympathy to student movements, particularly after the after the Killing of Benno Ohnesorg, but he did not believe street violence had the potential to effect change. Before his death in 1969, Adorno said, "I established a theoretical model of thought. How could I have expected that people would want to implement it with Molotov cocktails?" Angela Davis recounted advice given to her by Adorno that critical theorists working in the radical movements of the 1960s were, "akin to a media studies scholar deciding to become a radio technician".

In The Theory of the Novel (1971), György Lukács criticized the "leading German intelligentsia", including some members of the Frankfurt School (Adorno is named explicitly), as inhabiting the Grand Hotel Abyss, a metaphorical place from which the theorists comfortably analyze the abyss, the world beyond. Lukács described this contradictory situation as follows: They inhabit "a beautiful hotel, equipped with every comfort, on the edge of an abyss, of nothingness, of absurdity. And the daily contemplation of the abyss, between excellent meals or artistic entertainments, can only heighten the enjoyment of the subtle comforts offered."

The singular exception to this was Herbert Marcuse, who engaged enthusiastically with the New Left in the 1960s and 70s. Marcuse's One-Dimensional Man described the containment of the working class by material consumption and mass media that diverted any possibility of a proletarian revolution. Although Marcuse considered this pessimistic state of affairs to be fait accompli when the book was published in 1964, he was surprised and pleased when almost immediately the civil rights movement intensified and serious opposition to the Vietnam war began. Student activists such as the Students for a Democratic Society in turn took an interest in Marcuse and his works. Formerly an obscure academic émigré, he rapidly became a controversial public intellectual known as the "Guru of the New Left". Marcuse did not aim for narrow, incremental reforms but for the "Great Refusal" of all existing culture and "total revolution" against capitalism. In the democratic protests movements, Marcuse saw agents of change that could supplement the quiescent working class and unite with third-world Communist revolutionaries.

Marcuse took an active role in the New Left, organizing events with students in the United States and the West German student movement. Throughout these activities he articulated ideas like those in his 1965 article, Repressive Tolerance concerning free speech and the use of violence. Marcuse argued that since Western societies engaged in imperialism abroad and repressed minorities at home, there was a "clear and present danger" justifying a "natural right" to resistance. He said, therefore, that contrary to traditional notions of free speech, speech that served to legitimize the status quo should not be tolerated. There was strong opposition to these ideas from the political right and also some opposition from the left. Douglas Kellner commented that the rhetoric of "clear and present danger" was often used by authorities to suppress radical resistance. German student leaders such as Rudi Dutschke interpreted Marcuse to legitimize their activities. Dutschke's willingness to consider violence was criticized by Jürgen Habermas as "left fascism" which drew condemnation from Oskar Negt and others. Habermas later withdrew the accusation of fascism during the German Autumn of 1977.

Marcuse's relationship with Horkheimer and Adorno was strained by their divergence of opinion about the student movements. The Sozialistischer Deutscher Studentenbund was harshly critical of Adorno for his lack of political engagement and would disrupt his lectures. When a student's room was trashed for refusing to take part in protests, Adorno wrote, "praxis serves as an ideological pretext for exercising moral constraint." Adorno further said it was a manifestation of the authoritarian personality. Adorno's student Hans-Jürgen Krahl was also critical of Adorno's inaction. When in January 1969, Krahl led a group of students to occupy a room, Adorno called the police to remove them, further angering the students. Marcuse criticized Adorno's decision to call the police, writing,  Adorno replied that the actions of the students had been Stalinist and fascist. He mocked Marcuse for taking offense at Habermas' use of the phrase "left fascism", writing, 

In the 1970s, perceiving the limitations of the New Left, Marcuse de-emphasized the third world and revolutionary violence in favor of a focus on social issues in the United States. He sought to recruit other movements on the political periphery, such as environmentalism and feminism, to a popular front for socialism. During this period, he spoke enthusiastically about women's liberation, seeing in it echoes of his earlier work in Eros and Civilization. Seeing that the revolutionary moment of the 1960s was over, Marcuse advised students to avoid even a suggestion of terrorism. Instead he advocated the "long march through the institutions" and recommended educational institutions as a refuge for radicals in the U.S.

The Frankfurt School was a significant influence on Paolo Freire in the conception of critical pedagogy, alongside influences from orthodox Marxism, the Praxis School, and Frantz Fanon. Freire's work made major inroads towards increasing literacy in Brazil and the third world, which Freire saw as an essential step towards raising class consciousness. Critical pedagogy was meant initially to address the needs of peasants resisting oppression rather than students in the United States, who attend universities as part of a process of entering the social or economic elite. Amidst the decline of the New Left, rise of neoconservativism, and election of Ronald Reagan, leftist academics turned from revolutionary economic Marxism towards cultural Marxism. Animated by Aronowitz's reminder of Marx's dictum, "the ultimate task of philosophy and theory was not merely to 'comprehend reality' but to change it", Henry Giroux sought to make the university classroom a site for class struggle. Giroux drew on the work of Gramsci and the British cultural Marxists in conceiving of teachers as a revolutionary vanguard. Alongside Michael Apple, Giroux popularized Freire in educational studies, to the point that Freirian language and techniques of critical pedagogy became ubiquitous in liberal arts classrooms of the 1990s. The value of these practices were questioned in the broader cultural conversation on political correctness.

See also

References

Further reading

 Arato, Andrew and Eike Gebhardt, Eds. The Essential Frankfurt School Reader. New York: Continuum, 1982.
 Bernstein, Jay (ed.). The Frankfurt School: Critical Assessments I–VI. New York: Routledge, 1994.
 Benhabib, Seyla. Critique, Norm, and Utopia: A Study of the Foundations of Critical Theory. New York: Columbia University Press, 1986.
 Bottomore, Tom. The Frankfurt School and its Critics. New York: Routledge, 2002.
 Bronner, Stephen Eric and Douglas MacKay Kellner (eds.). Critical Theory and Society: A Reader. New York: Routledge, 1989.
 Brosio, Richard A. The Frankfurt School: An Analysis of the Contradictions and Crises of Liberal Capitalist Societies.  1980.
 Crone, Michael (ed.): Vertreter der Frankfurter Schule in den Hörfunkprogrammen 1950–1992. Hessischer Rundfunk, Frankfurt am Main 1992. (Bibliography.)
 Friedman, George. The Political Philosophy of the Frankfurt School. Ithaca, New York: Cornell University Press, 1981.
 Gerhardt, Christina. "Frankfurt School". The International Encyclopedia of Revolution and Protest, 1500 to the Present. 8 vols. Ed. Immanuel Ness. Malden, Mass.: Blackwell, 2009. 12–13.
 Held, David. Introduction to Critical Theory: Horkheimer to Habermas. Berkeley: University of California Press, 1980.
 
 Jay, Martin. The Dialectical Imagination: A History of the Frankfurt School and the Institute for Social Research 1923–1950. Berkeley, California: University of California Press. 1996.
 
 Kompridis, Nikolas. Critique and Disclosure: Critical Theory between Past and Future. Cambridge, Massachusetts: MIT Press, 2006.
 Postone, Moishe. Time, Labor, and Social Domination: A Reinterpretation of Marx's Critical Theory. Cambridge, Massachusetts: Cambridge University Press, 1993.
 Schwartz, Frederic J. Blind Spots: Critical Theory and the History of Art in Twentieth-Century Germany. New Haven, Connecticut: Yale University Press, 2005.
 Shapiro, Jeremy J. "The Critical Theory of Frankfurt". Times Literary Supplement 3 (4 October 1974) 787.
 Scheuerman, William E. Frankfurt School Perspectives on Globalization, Democracy, and the Law. 3rd ed. New York: Routledge, 2008.
 Wiggershaus, Rolf. The Frankfurt School: Its History, Theories and Political Significance. Cambridge, Massachusetts: MIT Press, 1995.
 Wheatland, Thomas. The Frankfurt School in Exile. Minneapolis: University of Minnesota Press, 2009.

External links
 Official website of the Institute for Social Research at the University of Frankfurt 
 Gerhardt, Christina. "Frankfurt School (Jewish émigrés)". The International Encyclopedia of Revolution and Protest. Ness, Immanuel (ed). Blackwell Publishing, 2009. Blackwell Reference Online.
 
 The Frankfurt School on the Marxists Internet Archive
 BBC Radio 4 Audio documentary "In our time: the Frankfurt School"

 
Critical theory
Cultural studies
Goethe University Frankfurt
Historical schools
Marxist schools of thought
Political philosophy
Social philosophy
Sociological theories
Weimar culture